The 2014 2. deild karla (English: Men's Second Division) is the 49th season of third-tier football in Iceland. Twelve teams will contest the league. Play began on 10 May and concluded on 20 September.

The league champions were newly promoted Fjarðabyggð, who finished 7 points ahead of second-placed Grótta. Both clubs were therefore promoted to the 1. deild for the 2015 season. At the other end of the table, Völsungur and Reynir S. were both relegated to the 2015 3. deild karla.

Teams
The league was contested by twelve clubs, eight of which played in the division during the 2012 season. There were four new clubs from the previous campaign:
KF and Völsungur were relegated from the 2013 1. deild karla, replacing HK and KV who were promoted to the 2014 1. deild karla
Fjarðabyggð and Huginn were promoted from the 2013 3. deild karla, in place of Höttur and Hamar who were relegated to the 2014 3. deild karla

Club information

League table

Results
Each team plays every opponent once home and away for a total of 22 matches per club, and 132 matches altogether.

References

2. deild karla seasons
Iceland
Iceland
3